Joey van Ingen (born 17 September 1990, Denekamp), known professionally as Radical Redemption, is a Dutch hardstyle DJ and record producer. He has played at several festivals such as Defqon.1, Dominator and Loudness.

Early life 
Joey van Ingen grew up in Denekamp. As a child, he was always interested in music. When he was 10, he started drumming, then in high school, he played in various bands, including Stille, which became his most important project. He also came into contact with dance music at the same time. He then bought a turntable and started practising to make music. Later he also organised hardstyle parties for his friends at home.

Career 
Radical Redemption mainly produces raw hardstyle. He also produces hardcore music and is part of Minus Militia, a trio consisting of Radical Redemption, Chain Reaction and Crypsis. He is signed to the Most Wanted DJ artist agency.

In 2012, Radical Redemption released his debut album called Annihilate. This was released on the label Minus Is More.

In 2014, he entered the DJMag Top 100 DJs, at number 64. In the 2017 poll, for which the results were released on 21 October 2017, Radical Redemption was voted the 44th most popular DJ. In 2018 he was at number 69 in the list of DJ Mag's Top 100 DJs.

Discography

Albums

Singles

References

External links 
 Official website
 Discogs link

1990 births
Dutch DJs
Hardstyle musicians
Living people
Electronic dance music DJs